Pedro Alcantara de Souza (died 1 April 2010) was a Brazilian land reform activist operating in the state of Pará. He was shot dead on April 1, 2010. Souza was a farmers' union president, and city councilor of Redenção. In 2008, 20 killings have been relate to land issues in the Amazon.

Death and aftermath
De Souza was shot in the head five times by two men on motorcycles while he was riding his bicycle on the outskirts of the town of Belém. The assassination occurred shortly after the trial of a man accused of masterminding the killing of another rain forest activist in 2005. The activist Dorothy Stang was an American nun was shot and killed in 2005. Watchdog groups say that conflicts between powerful ranchers and poor farmers over land rights have led to 1,200 murders across Brazil in the last 20 years.

See also 
 List of unsolved murders

References 

2010 deaths
Assassinated activists
Assassinated Brazilian politicians
Brazilian activists
Deaths by firearm in Brazil
Male murder victims
People murdered in Brazil
Unsolved murders in Brazil
Year of birth missing